Jean Kickx (9 March 1775 in Brussels – 27 March 1831 in Brussels) Son of Jacques Kickx (d. 1802) and Marie van Esschen (d. 1802) was a Belgian botanist and mineralogist. His son Jean Kickx (1803-1864) and grandson Jean Jacques Kickx (1842-1887) both became professors of botany at the University of Ghent.

He worked as a professor of botany, pharmacy and mineralogy in Brussels, becoming a member of the Royal Belgian Academy in 1817. In 1827 Barthélemy Charles Joseph Dumortier named the genus Kickxia (family Plantaginaceae) in his honor.

Principal works 
 "Flora bruxellensis, exhibens characteres generum et specierum plantarum", 1812.
 "Tentamen Mineralogicum: seu mineralium nova distributio in classes, ordines, genera, species, cum varietatibus et synonimis auctorum, cui additur lexicon mineralogicum in quo artis vocabula exponuntur", 1820.
 "Accurata descriptio plantarum officinalium et venenatarum tum phanerogamarum tum cryptogamarum, in agro Lovaniensi sponte crescentium", 1827.

References 

1775 births
1831 deaths
Scientists from Brussels
Flemish botanists
Belgian mineralogists
Members of the Royal Academy of Belgium